The 1897 Southern Intercollegiate Athletic Association football season was the college football games played by the members schools of the Southern Intercollegiate Athletic Association as part of the 1897 college football season

The season began on October 2. Conference play began on October 9 with Georgia shutting out Clemson 24–0 in Athens.

After the Sewanee game, Coach R. G. Acton's Vanderbilt Commodores claimed the program's first ever conference title. This was followed by a challenge met by the other southern team to claim a championship, South Atlantic school Virginia; which claims seven prior championships of the South. The game ended a 0–0 tie. Said Coach Acton, "It was the best game ever played in the South." Vanderbilt held all opponents scoreless.

The Texas Longhorns averaged the most points per game in the conference.

The 1897 season was one in which a member school, Tulane University, was barred from intercollegiate football participation by SIAA President, Dr. Dudley.  This was part of a sanction handed down in response to the LSU game the previous season in which Tulane was forced to forfeit for having fielded an ineligible player.
 
The season was also notable for the game Virginia played against Georgia, featuring the death of Richard Von Albade Gammon.

Season overview

Results and team statistics

Key

PPG = Average of points scored per game
PAG = Average of points allowed per game

Regular season

SIAA teams in bold.

Week One

Week Two

Week Three

Week Four

Week Five

Week Six

Week Seven

Week Eight

Week Nine

Week Ten

Week Eleven

Week Twelve

Week Thirteen

Week Fourteen

Week Fifteen

Week Sixteen

References